Thiha Zaw (born 25 February 1994 in Myanmar) is a Burmese footballer playing as a defender for Burmese club Yangon United. He was promoted from the Yangon Youth Team to the Yangon United Senior Team.

Club career

Yangon United
Zaw played his first match for Yangon United in a 5 - 0 win over Magwe. He replaced the injured Khin Maung Lwin.

References

1994 births
Living people
People from Yangon Region
Burmese footballers
Association football defenders
Yangon United F.C. players